Thy Art Is Murder is an Australian deathcore band from Blacktown, Sydney, that formed in 2006. The band consists of vocalist Chris "CJ" McMahon, guitarists Sean Delander and Andy Marsh, drummer Jesse Beahler and bassist Kevin Butler. Thy Art Is Murder has released five studio albums since formation.

Their 2008 EP Infinite Death, reached position no. 10 on the AIR Charts upon release, and their second full-length album Hate debuted at no. 35 on the ARIA Charts, making them the first extreme metal band to ever reach the Top 40 of this chart. The album also reached no. 1 on AIR and both no. 2 and no. 4 respectively on the US and Canadian iTunes metal charts on its week of release.

The band's following albums Holy War (June 2015) and Dear Desolation (August 2017) charted on US Billboard 200. Human Target was released in July 2019.

History

2006–2008: Formation, demo and Infinite Death EP

Formed in 2006, in the Western Sydney locality of Blacktown, the group originally consisted of vocalist Brendan van Ryn, guitarists Gary Markowski and Sean Delander, bassist Josh King, and drummer Lee Stanton. Most members were around 15 years old at the time.

In 2007 they released their first demo, the three track This Hole Isn't Deep Enough for the Twelve of You,  and began playing local shows. They quickly gained a loyal fanbase among local deathcore fans in Western Sydney due to their highly energetic performances, and went on to independently tour the east coast of Australia. 

After touring they returned to the studio to record their first EP Infinite Death, of which all lyrics were written by Brendan van Ryn after the instrumentals were recorded. Infinite Death was released in 2008 via Shock and subsequently Skull And Bones Records.

The Infinite Death EP was also published on the band's official Myspace page, leading an explosion of popularity around the world. The album gained notoriety due to the technical nature of their deathcore sound, and also their sacrilegious and misogynistic content. The EP reached number 10 on the AIR Charts.

2008–2010: Line-up changes and The Adversary
Following the breakout release of Infinite Death and two years of relentless national touring, it was announced in 2008 that van Ryn was departing from the group. It was initially claimed that he left the group due to creative differences (wanting to continue making deathcore instead of technical death metal) and an inability to keep up with their evolving technical sound.  However it was later claimed in 2013 by his replacement Chris "CJ" McMahon that van Ryn was removed because "he couldn't sing [live] and he had a massive attitude problem." 

Thy Art Is Murder searched for a year for a new vocalist, until finding Chris "CJ" McMahon from Sydney metalcore band Vegas in Ruins. The band were so impressed with his death growl vocals that he was incepted into the band during 2009. 

Bassist Mick Lowe replaced King shortly before the band began tracking demos for their first full-length album The Adversary. The demos recorded in 2009 included early versions of the songs "Engineering the Antichrist" and "Cowards Throne". In 2010, the group began recording the album's final recording sessions and released the album on 16 July 2010.

Thy Art Is Murder supported the release of The Adversary with Canadian deathcore band Despised Icon's Australian leg of their Farewell Tour, which also included The Red Shore.

2011–2014: Hate

2011 saw further line-up changes, notably the departure of founding member and lead guitarist Gary Markowski. Delander decided to switch duties from guitar to bass, making way for Andy Marsh and Tom Brown to join on guitar. Following the band's first European tour in 2012 with War from a Harlots Mouth and As Blood Runs Black the band traveled to Belleville, NJ in the United States to record their second album with producer Will Putney at the Machine Shop recording studios.

Following their Australian tour with Fear Factory in September 2012, Hate was released on 19 October 2012. The first single, "Reign of Darkness", had been premiered earlier on radio station Triple J's The Racket on 18 September.

The album debuted at No. 35 on the ARIA Charts, making Thy Art Is Murder the first extreme metal band to ever to break the top 40. The album also reached No. 1 on AIR. The album was met with a mix of some positive and some negative criticism. Kevin Stewart-Panko of Decibel Magazine awarded Hate a score of 1 out of 10 and criticizing the band for not going "out of their way to push the envelope or add a modicum of originality or value to metal as a whole." In January 2013, the band performed at the Sydney Big Day Out festival; the only other extreme metal band ever to be featured on the line-up was Blood Duster in 2004. Following their second European tour in February and March Thy Art Is Murder signed to Nuclear Blast on 24 January 2013 for distribution of Hate outside Australia. On 13 March 2013, Triple J announced that Thy Art Is Murder would be headlining the Hate Across Australia tour with Cattle Decapitation, King Parrot and Aversions Crown.

On 11 April 2013, Sumerian Records officially announced that the group had just lost the opening support on the United States' annual Summer Slaughter Tour. The announcement was met by some controversy due to the fact that the group was to be chosen by a voters' poll and American deathcore band Rings of Saturn had in fact won the vote by 1%. Eventually, promoters chose to include both bands.

On 17 June 2013 the band revealed they would be touring across Australia with Parkway Drive as part of their 10 Years of Parkway Drive tour. The same day, the band lost out to Bleed from Within at the Metal Hammer Golden Gods Awards where they had been nominated as Best New Band. On 15 October 2013 the band were nominated in the Best Hard Rock/Heavy Metal category for the 2013 ARIA Awards, eventually losing out to Karnivool. The band headlined their second ever tour through North America in November and December 2013, dubbing it the Hate Across America. The bill featured support from I Declare War, Fit for an Autopsy, The Last Ten Seconds of Life and Kublai Khan with many dates selling out. The band headlined in Europe in January and February 2014, selling out most venues. Support came from Heart of a Coward, Aversions Crown and Aegaeon. The band was announced on the lineup for Download Festival 2014.

The band made Australian news headlines in late February 2014, when McMahon encouraged fans to get onstage during their set on Brisbane leg of the Soundwave Festival tour. Promoter AJ Maddah later tweeted his decision to take the band off the rest of the tour calling them "disrespectful arseholes" and claiming that McMahon had told the crowd that "there are thousand of you and dozens of security. Smash them. All of you get on the stage". Fan footage uploaded on YouTube revealed that Maddah's version of McMahon's pre-song speech were embellished. The following day both the promoter and the band tweeted that Thy Art Is Murder would be allowed to play the remainder of the tour. McMahon later commented on the incident, saying "it’s just all bullshit... I just wanted the crowd participation, wanted people to try and make their way up on-stage and have a crazy show"; however, he also expressed positive feelings to the aftermath as he felt the coverage of the incident gave the band free publicity.

The band announced their participation in the Mosh Lives tour, headlined by Emmure, travelling the US in March and April 2014. The band headlined a short Canadian tour with Sworn In in April 2014. The band played New England Metal And Hardcore Festival in April 2014. The band also took part at the Summer Slaughter the same year. Vocalist CJ McMahon commented on the band's activity, claiming they are "one of, if not the most hardest-working touring bands" and saying that "[there's] no other fucking band on the face of this earth that will tour as much as we do". They also supported Born of Osiris on their Tomorrow We Die Alive tour in November 2014 in North America with ERRA, Within the Ruins and Betraying the Martyrs.

2015–2018: Holy War and Dear Desolation

On 31 March 2015 it was announced that Thy Art Is Murder's then-upcoming album would be titled Holy War and would be released on 30 June in North America via Nuclear Blast Entertainment. It was recorded in secret over the winter with producer Will Putney. Thy Art Is Murder, alongside other bands, supported Slayer on 2015's Mayhem Festival, which toured the U.S. from June to August. Holy War had a successful first week of sales, charting at No. 7 in Australia and No. 82 in the U.S., being the fourth Australian band to chart in the U.S. as well as the first Australian extreme metal band to chart.

They supported Parkway Drive on all of their worldwide tour in support of Ire through 2015 and 2016. The band announced on 21 December 2015, that vocalist CJ McMahon had decided to leave the band to focus on his family due to his inability to afford touring. After some teaser posters, in 1 July, the band confirmed work on a split album titled The Depression Sessions shared with the deathcore bands Fit for an Autopsy and The Acacia Strain. It was released exclusively on vinyl. The same day, the band premiered a music video for the song "They Will Know Another" from the album. In 2016, guitarist Sean Delander filled in for the late Tom Searle on the Architects Australian tour.

On 14 January 2017, former vocalist McMahon rejoined the band onstage at Unify Festival in Tarwin Meadows, Victoria, where he confirmed his return to the group, and that the show was for the fans a "celebration that is me coming back to join my brothers in world domination." The band released their fourth studio album, titled Dear Desolation, on 18 August 2017.

In an interview in October 2017, guitarist Andy Marsh confirmed that had McMahon not returned that they would've recorded Dear Desolation with their at the time fill-in vocalist, Nick Arthur (of Molotov Solution). In the same interview, he also shared that the band had started planning a new split EP to follow-up 2016's The Depression Sessions.

2019–present: Human Target
On 1 April 2019 it was revealed longtime drummer Lee Stanton had departed the band and their fill-in Jesse Beahler of the American death metal band Jungle Rot had taken his place full-time. On 26 April 2019, the band revealed their new album would be titled Human Target and released the title track single. The album was released on 26 July 2019 through Nuclear Blast Records.

On 30 October 2020, the band released a single titled "Killing Season" which guitarist Andy Marsh explained was about Thanksgiving revealing "Killing Season touches on the darkness surrounding the origins of Thanksgiving, and while that subject is relevant at this time of year, we want you to think of the atrocities both past and present that deserve acknowledgement."

Musical style and influences
Thy Art is Murder's music has been described by music critics as deathcore, which draws from both metalcore and death metal. Vocalist CJ McMahon mentioned in interviews with Bluestribute TV and Aggressive Tendencies that the band, individually, has different inspirations and musicians that influence their particular writing and performance style. He added that the band all together are influenced by bands like Decapitated, Gojira, Meshuggah, and Behemoth. The band have frequently cited Behemoth as a major influence on their style whom McMahon has referred to as "the best band on this planet." Guitarist Andy Marsh has said that "We are big fans of music that can evoke a feeling and mood, but often that music isn’t very in your face and heavy. Behemoth are amazing at capturing that synergy in just the right way and it is that ethos that inspires us." Their band's album, Hate, expresses the band's dislike of organized religion. The band's third full-length album, Holy War, discusses a range of themes, from their anti-religion and anti-extremism to animal rights, war, and greed.

Members

Current
 Sean Delander – rhythm guitar (2006–2011, 2015–present); bass (2011–2015)
 Andy Marsh – lead guitar (2010–present); rhythm guitar (2013–2015)
 Kevin Butler – bass (2015–present)
 Chris "CJ" McMahon – vocals (2009–2015, 2017–present)
 Jesse Beahler – drums (2019–present; touring member 2015–2016)

Former
 Brendan van Ryn – vocals (2006–2008)
 Josh King – bass (2006–2009)
 Mick Low – bass (2009–2010)
 Gary Markowski – lead guitar (2006–2010)
 Tom Brown – rhythm guitar (2011–2013)
 Lee Stanton – drums (2006–2015, 2016–2019)

Former touring musicians
Wes Hauch – guitars (2014)
Roman Koester – guitars (2013–2014)
Monte Barnard – vocals (2016)
Lochlan Watt – vocals (2016)
Mike Mulholland – guitars (2018)
Nick Arthur – vocals (2015–2016, 2016–2017, 2019)
Bobak Rafiee – vocals (2022)

Timeline

Discography 

Studio albums

EPs

Demos

Music videos

Awards and nominations

ARIA Music Awards
The ARIA Music Awards are a set of annual ceremonies presented by Australian Recording Industry Association (ARIA), which recognise excellence, innovation, and achievement across all genres of the music of Australia. They commenced in 1987. 

! 
|-
| 2013 || Hate || rowspan="2"| ARIA Award for Best Hard Rock or Heavy Metal Album ||  || rowspan="2"|
|-
| 2015 || Holy War ||

Notes

References

External links
 
 
 
 Thy Art Is Murder at Nuclear Blast

2006 establishments in Australia
Australian death metal musical groups
Australian metalcore musical groups
Deathcore musical groups
Musical groups from Sydney
Musical groups established in 2006
Metal Blade Records artists
Musical quintets
Nuclear Blast artists